The Zero Boys are an American hardcore punk quartet from Indianapolis, Indiana fronted by Paul Mahern that debuted in 1980. Other members include bassist Scott Kellogg, drummer Mark Cutsinger and guitarist Dave Lawson. The band was known as one of the few popular hardcore bands from the Midwest, as the scene was mostly dominated by bands from the coasts.

History
The band formed in June 1980 and three months later released their first EP. Entitled Livin' in the '80s, it was a 7" EP released by the band on their home-brew Z-Disc label. Their debut full-length album, Vicious Circle, was released in 1982 with its distinctive bright yellow cover on the local label Nimrod Records. The band embarked on a 1982 "Hell Tour" with one notable appearance at The Barn in Torrance, CA, on a bill with Dead Kennedys, MDC, and Minor Threat.

Vicious Circle was reissued on Toxic Shock later in the 1980s, with added bonus tracks taken from the Affirmation Records compilations LPs The Master Tape and The Master Tapes 2. It was reissued again in 2000 by Lookout! Records, without the Master Tape tracks, but with two additional songs from the original album sessions, "She Said Goodbye" and "Slam and Worm", which had been given limited release on a 7" single.

The Zero Boys managed to record a handful of tracks intended for a second LP, but broke up before the album could be finished. These tracks were released on the History of the Zero Boys cassette on Affirmation, along with the above-mentioned compilation tracks and other demo tracks and outtakes. 

In 2009, Secretly Canadian reissued both "Vicious Circle" and "History Of", making the latter available on CD for the first time.

Since their breakup, the band has reunited for the occasional gig, including a series of shows at CBGB's designed to raise money to help keep the club open, and a series of shows in 2006 – 2012 where they performed the entire Vicious Circle album. The new lineup consisted of Paul Mahern, Tufty, Mark Cutsinger, and Vess Ruhtenberg of The Lemonheads on guitar as original guitarist Terry "Hollywood" Howe died in 2001.

Paul Mahern went on to form the power pop band the Datura Seeds and has since become a producer in Bloomington, Indiana, where he also teaches yoga and owns the Affirmation Records label.

In 2012, Vess Ruhtenberg and Tufty left the band just before a European tour. Scott Kellogg (bass) and Dave Lawson (guitar) are their replacements. In February 2013 the new band released an EP titled "Pro Dirt." This was their first release in 20 years. The Zero Boys' new LP, Monkey, was released on May 20, 2014.

Band members
Timeline

Discography

Studio albums
  Vicious Circle (Toxic Shock/Secretly Canadian/Panic Button/Lookout!/Fundamenta]/Rifleman/Nimrod/P-Vine) (1981)
 Make It Stop (Bitzcore) (1991) 
 The Heimlich Maneuver (Skyclad) (1993)
 Monkey (Z-Disk) (2014)

Singles and EPs
 Livin' In The 80's 7" EP (Z-Disk) (1980)
 Split 7" EP with Toxic Reasons (Selfless) (1992) - "Black Network News", "Blood's Good"
 "We're Gonna Love" / "U.S.A." (Skyclad) (1993)
 Pro Dirt 7" EP (1-2-3-4 Go!) (2013)
 Hollywood 10"/CD EP (Z-Disk) (2014)

Compilations
 History Of (Affirmation) (1984)

Compilation Appearances
 Red Snerts-The Sound Of Gulcher (Gulcher) (1981) - "New Generation'
 The Master Tape (Nimrod/Affirmation) (1982) - "High Places", "Human Body", Mom's Wallet)
 A Drink For Sue Ellen (Schrott) (1983) - "Outta Style", "High Times"
 The Master Tape Vol. 2 2XLP (Affirmation) (1983) - "Black Network News", "I Need Energy"
 Killed By Death #4 (Redrum) (1989) - "Stoned To Death", "Stick To Your Guns", "I'm Bored", "A Piece Of Me"
 Live Treatment cass. (Shotgunning Tape SXXXXX Inc./Discraceland) (1989) - "I'm Bored"
 Parkhof Live Nr. 2 cass. (I Hate Billie Tapes) (1991) - "01-05-88"
 Life Is Too Short For Boring Music Vol. 11 (To Be Continued) (EPA) (1992) - "Indianapolis"
 Faster & Louder - Hardcore Punk Vol. 2 (Rhino Records|Rhino) (1993) - "Civilization's Dying"
 For A Fistful of Yeng! (Bitzcore/Indigo) (1994) - "Indianapolis", "Positive Change"
 Decade Of Disasters (Westworld) (1994) - "Living In The 80's"
 Strange Notes! A Germs Cover Compilation (Bitzcore) (1994) - "What We Do Is Secret"
 So You Wanna Be A Rock'N'Roll Compilation? (Bitzcore) (1995) - "Down The Drain", "Civilization's Dying", "Outta Style"
 Splitter Kompilaischn (Art Beat) (1997)- "Civilization's Dying"
 Dangerously Unstable (Suburban Voice) (1999) - "Positive Change"
 American Revolution Vol. 1-Rare Hardcore Punk From The United States 1978-1984 CDr (Killer Boot) (2000) - "Black Network News"
 Bank Robber Music Compilation Vol. 17-Winter 2008 (Bank Robber Music) (2008) - "Hightime"
 Collectors #2 (Volume) (2009) - "Livin' In The 80's"
 Survive + Music CDr (not on label) (2011) - "New Generation"
 Early Indiana Punk And New Wave (The Crazy Al's Year(s) 1976-1983 (Time Change) - "Commies", "I'm Absent"
 Ox Compilation #114 (Oz Fanzine) (2014) - "Someone To Blame"
 Memorable But Not Honorable Mix Tape Vol. 10 cass. (Memorable But Not Honorable) (2021) - "Livin' In The 80's"

Videos
 Live At Cosmo's 1984 DVD (Rifleman) (2006)
 Live At The Pizza Castle-1981 DVD (Gnome Park Productions) (2009)

References

External links
 
 KBD Records blog entry on History of cassette
 Live performance of entire Vicious Circle album from 2005 can be heard at MusicalFamilyTree.net

Hardcore punk groups from Indiana
Punk rock groups from Indiana
Musical groups from Indianapolis
Musical quartets
1979 establishments in Indiana
1985 disestablishments in Indiana
Musical groups established in 1979
Musical groups disestablished in 1985
Musical groups reestablished in 1988
Musical groups disestablished in 1993
Musical groups reestablished in 2006
Secretly Canadian artists